Bayrampaşa (pronounced ) is a suburban district of Istanbul, Turkey on the European side of the city.

The mayor is Atila Aydıner (AK Party).

History
Up to 1936, Bayrampaşa was part of Fatih district. It was then part of Eyüp district between 1936 and 1990.

Until 1970, the area was known as Sağmalcılar, when a large outbreak of cholera, caused by pollution of the Ottoman-built water supply by new buildings and factories, led to the area being quarantined. Following this incident, the name Sağmalcılar became synonymous with cholera, so the district was renamed Bayrampaşa, after the 17th-century Ottoman grand vizier Bayram Pasha. Little of the Ottoman water system, which was built by Mimar Sinan, remains today.

On 1 December 2015, an explosion occurred near Bayrampaşa metro station, leaving several injured.

Geography
The people of Bayrampaşa are mainly Albanians and Bosniaks.

The housing in Bayrampaşa is generally considered to be of poor quality, with workshops and small factories even in the residential streets, while large areas of the district are purely industrial.

The district comprises both working class residential and industrial areas.

The district's neighbours are Gaziosmanpaşa to the north, Eyüp to the east, Zeytinburnu to the south, and Esenler to the west.

A number of important public buildings are in the area:

Istanbul's largest prison (currently decommissioned)
two large sports complexes
the main bus station (which is actually in Bayrampaşa, although it is named Esenler bus station)

Bayrampaşa lies on the route of the old road to Thrace and a number of major roads and a light railway run through the middle of the area.

Bayrampaşa is famous for its artichokes produced in the past, but now although there is no production in the region its name is given to a variety of artichoke in Turkey. A large statue of an artichoke is located in the middle of the district which has become a symbol of the region.

The local football team based in the district is called Bayrampaşaspor.

Twin cities 
  Novi Pazar, Serbia

References

Bibliography

External links
 District governor's official website 
 District municipality's official website 
 Miscellaneous images of Bayrampaşa

 
Populated places in Istanbul Province
Districts of Istanbul Province